KF Përparimi is a football club based in the village of Rečane near Gostivar, North Macedonia. They recently competed in the Macedonian Third League (West Division).

History
The club was founded in 1974.

References

External links
Club info at MacedonianFootball 
Football Federation of Macedonia 

Perparimi
Association football clubs established in 1974
1974 establishments in the Socialist Republic of Macedonia
FK
Perparimi